Grafton College London is a small, private college that provides undergraduate, postgraduate and professional training courses.

Curriculum 
It provides Business and Management courses in London. The College runs courses in Business, Management, Computing, Accounting & Finance and Travel & Tourism and English Language.

The Open University offers degree courses in partnership with Grafton College.

History 
The college was founded in 2003. The college taught courses supplied by Pearson PLC until it suspended its relationship with Grafton College following a 2017 BBC Panorama investigation.

Panorama investigation
In 2017 an investigation broadcast on 13 November 2017 by BBC Panorama found cases of student loan fraud and breaches of academic integrity at the college, including an offer from hairdresser Saeed Imran Sheikh that assignments could be fraudulently completed by agents in Pakistan, and an example of a fraudulent certificate produced by the British Awarding Association (Awarding Body for Vocational Achievement (AVA) Ltd) located in the same building as Grafton College. Sheikh claimed that he had obtained them from Grafton's Head Of Operations Asif Khawaja.

References

External links
Official website

Higher education colleges in London
Business schools in England
2003 establishments in England